Omm ol Khassa or Omm ol Khessa, also rendered as Omm ol Khesey, Omm ol Khasha, and Omm Khosi, may refer to:
 Omm ol Khassa-ye Olya
 Omm ol Khassa-ye Sofla
 Omm ol Khassa-ye Vosta